William Henry Gladstone (3 June 1840 – 4 July 1891) was a British Liberal Party Member of Parliament, and the eldest son of Prime Minister William Ewart Gladstone and his wife Catherine  Glynne.

Life
Gladstone was born in Hawarden, Flintshire, Wales. He attended Eton College and read Greek and Latin at Christ Church, Oxford University.  He was a member of parliament for a total of 20 years, representing Chester for three, Whitby for twelve and East Worcestershire for five.

A singer and organist, he was well versed in musical history, especially the development of Anglican church music. He wrote on musical topics, and one of the views he expressed was that choral church services were to be deplored because "the choirs often discourage the congregations from singing". He wrote the anthems "Gracious and Righteous" and "Withdraw Not Thou", and chants, anthems, introits and organ voluntaries.  He composed the hymn tunes Hammersmith, to which "Dear Lord and Father of Mankind" is sometimes set, and Ombersley, sometimes used for "Lord of All Being, Throned Afar".

William played for Scotland in the first unofficial England v Scotland Football International in 1870. He was one of two sitting members of parliament to play for Scotland in this match, the other being John Wingfield Malcolm, MP for Boston.

When his mother's brother Sir Stephen Glynne died without heirs in 1874, the Glynne baronetcy became extinct, but William inherited the Glynne estates, including Hawarden Castle, which had in any case been the Gladstones' family home since his grandfather Sir John Gladstone had used some of his substantial fortune to rescue the Glynne family from bankruptcy in the 1840s. He was appointed High Sheriff of Flintshire for 1888.

He died in London on 4 July 1891; his son William Glynne Charles Gladstone inherited Hawarden. His funeral at Hawarden was extremely well attended, and the poor of the parish were said to have "unmistakeably felt that they had lost a most kind and generous benefactor".

References

External links 
 
 
 
 
 

1840 births
1891 deaths
Welsh classical organists
British male organists
People from Hawarden
Children of prime ministers of the United Kingdom
People educated at Eton College
Alumni of Christ Church, Oxford
Liberal Party (UK) MPs for English constituencies
UK MPs 1865–1868
UK MPs 1868–1874
UK MPs 1874–1880
UK MPs 1880–1885
Welsh people of Scottish descent
William Henry Gladstone
England v Scotland representative footballers (1870–1872)
Wanderers F.C. players
High Sheriffs of Flintshire
Association footballers not categorized by position
Scottish footballers
19th-century classical musicians
19th-century British male musicians
Male classical organists
19th-century organists